Rafael Martins Claro dos Santos (born 29 November 1991), known as Rafael Martins, is a Brazilian professional footballer who plays as a goalkeeper for Saudi Arabian club Al-Sahel.

He spent two months on loan with Sampaio Corrêa in 2016, prior to his Coritiba debut, but was substitute goalkeeper in all 12 games.

On 16 August 2022, Martins joined Saudi Arabian club Al-Sahel.

References

External links

1991 births
Living people
Footballers from São Paulo (state)
Brazilian footballers
Association football goalkeepers
Campeonato Brasileiro Série A players
Saudi First Division League players
Coritiba Foot Ball Club players
Sampaio Corrêa Futebol Clube players
Grêmio Esportivo Brasil players
Guarani FC players
Al-Sahel SC (Saudi Arabia) players
Brazilian expatriate footballers
Expatriate footballers in Saudi Arabia
Brazilian expatriate sportspeople in Saudi Arabia